The International Age Rating Coalition (IARC) is an initiative aimed at streamlining acquisition of content ratings for video games, from authorities of different countries. Introduced in 2013, the IARC system simplifies the process of obtaining ratings by developers, through the use of questionnaires, which assess the content of the product. This new process reduces the costs of video game developers as they seek to obtain ratings for their products that are distributed digitally online.

The effort was created through a coalition of rating authorities from around the world, including ESRB in North America, PEGI in Europe, USK in Germany, ClassInd in Brazil, and the Australian Classification Board, and first announced by PEGI's MD at the 2013 London Games Conference. In August 2014, the Australian Classification Board introduced amendments to allow for the automated classification process employed by the IARC. On 19 December 2017, South Korea's Game Rating and Administration Committee (GRAC) became a member.

IARC generic rating system 
In addition to obtaining official age ratings from the coalition members, developers applying via IARC's process would also get a complimentary generic age rating for their software under IARC's name at any of the participating digital storefronts. These generic ratings can apply to any territory that does not have its own rating system and/or is not formally supported by any existing age rating bodies in the world. The rating also applies to territories whose own local rating body is not officially part of IARC's system yet, notably such as Japan's CERO rating. IARC plans to introduce this generic rating system into more storefronts in hopes of streamlining the age rating process for game developers. Storefronts that currently support IARC and its generic rating system include Google Play, Microsoft Store (both PC and Xbox versions), Nintendo eShop, Origin, PlayStation Store, Quest Store (formerly Oculus Store), Stadia Store, Luna store, and Pico Store. The IARC age ratings are the following:

Comparison table 
A comparison of participants, showing age on the horizontal axis. Note however that the specific criteria used in assigning a classification can vary widely from one country to another. Thus a color code or age range cannot be directly compared from one country to another.

Key:

  White  – No restrictions: Suitable for all ages / Aimed at young audiences / Exempt / Not rated / No applicable rating.
  Yellow  – No restrictions: Parental guidance is suggested for designated age range.
  Purple  – No restrictions: Not recommended for a younger audience but not restricted.	
  Red  – Restricted: Parental accompaniment required for younger audiences.
  Black  – Prohibitive: Exclusively for older audience / Purchase age-restricted / Banned.

Notes

References

External links 
 

Video game content ratings systems